The Vakhitov–Kolokolov stability criterion is a condition for linear stability (sometimes called spectral stability) of solitary wave solutions to a wide class of U(1)-invariant Hamiltonian systems, named after Soviet scientists Aleksandr Kolokolov (Александр Александрович Колоколов) and Nazib Vakhitov (Назиб Галиевич Вахитов).
The condition for linear stability of a solitary wave  with frequency  has the form

where  is the charge (or momentum) of the solitary wave
,
conserved by Noether's theorem due to U(1)-invariance of the system.

Original formulation

Originally, this criterion was obtained for the nonlinear Schrödinger equation,

The solution  is assumed to be complex-valued. Since the equation is U(1)-invariant, by Noether's theorem, it has an integral of motion,
, which is called charge or momentum, depending on the model under consideration.
For a wide class of functions , the nonlinear Schrödinger equation admits solitary wave solutions of the form
, where  and  decays for large 
(one often requires that  belongs to the Sobolev space ).
The Vakhitov–Kolokolov stability criterion,

is a condition of spectral stability of a solitary wave solution.

This result is based on an earlier work by Vladimir Zakharov.

Generalizations
This result has been generalized to abstract Hamiltonian systems with U(1)-invariance.
It was shown that under rather general conditions the Vakhitov–Kolokolov stability
criterion guarantees not only spectral stability
but also orbital stability of solitary waves.

The stability condition has been generalized
to traveling wave solutions
to the generalized Korteweg–de Vries equation of the form
.

The stability condition has also been generalized to Hamiltonian systems with a more general symmetry group.

See also
Derrick's theorem
Linear stability
Lyapunov stability
Nonlinear Schrödinger equation
Orbital stability

References

Stability theory
Solitons